A film treatment (or simply treatment) is a piece of prose, typically the step between scene cards (index cards) and the first draft of a screenplay for a motion picture, television program, or radio play. It is generally longer and more detailed than an outline (or one-page synopsis), and it may include details of directorial style that an outline omits. Treatments read like a short story, but are told in the present tense and describe events as they happen.  A treatment may also be created in the process of adapting a novel, play, or other pre-existing work into a screenplay.

Original draft treatment
The original draft treatment is created during the writing process and is generally long and detailed. It consists of full-scene outlines put together. Usually there are between thirty and eighty standard letter size or A4 pages (Courier New 12 point), with an average of about forty pages.  For example, the draft treatment of The Terminator is forty-eight pages long.

More elaborate forms of the draft treatment are the step outline and the scriptment.

Presentation treatment
The presentation treatment is created as presentation material. Generally, the scene card descriptions are written out in order, and only have the essential and important story events that make up the scenes. It is the full story in its simplest form, moving from the concept, to the theme, to the character, to the detailed synopsis of about four to eight pages of master scenes.

Presentation treatments are used to show how the production notes have been incorporated into the screenplay for the director and production executives to look over, or to leave behind as a presentation note after a sales pitch.

The presentation treatment is the appropriate treatment to submit if a script submission requires one. They are usually at least three, but fewer than thirty, pages in length, with most being of seven to twelve pages.

Usage
Treatments are widely used within the motion picture industry as selling documents to outline story and character aspects of a planned screenplay, whereas outlines are generally produced as part of the development process. Screenwriters may use a treatment to initially pitch a screenplay, but may also use a treatment to sell a concept they are pitching without a completed screenplay.

References

Treatment
Treatment
Screenwriting

de:Drehbuch#Treatment